Consular corps (from  and commonly abbreviated CC) is a concept analogous to diplomatic corps, but concerning the staff, estates and work of a consulate.

"While ambassadors and diplomatic staff are devoted to bettering all categories of the bilateral relationship with the host country, the consular corps is in charge of looking after their own foreign nationals in the host country."

See also 

Los Angeles Consular Corps
Rogers Act
Consular Corps in Greece

References

Further reading

External links